Sincéné may refer to:

Sincéné, Doulougou
Sincéné, Toece